Médanos, Buenos Aires, Argentina
Médanos (Entre Ríos), Argentina
Médanos de Coro National Park, Venezuela
Médanos (geology) - a type of sand dune
Médanos (appellation) - a geographic indication applied to wines
El Médano, Spain
Los Medanos College, Pittsburg, California